Ilayaraja is a 2019 Malayalam film written and directed by Madhav Ramadasan with a screenplay by Sudeep T George. Guinness Pakru, Harishree Ashokan, Gokul Suresh, Deepak Parampol, Baby Ardra and Master Adityan play the lead roles.

Plot 
Subru, the son of Vanajan, who runs a coffee shop in Thrissur and supports his family, is an extraordinary genius in chess. His skill makes him the hero of the town. A teacher who liked Subru's skill brought him from a government school to a public school. With this, Subru's life changes.

Cast

Soundtrack

Reception
Indian internet company Sify gives Ilayaraja  stars and states "Ilayaraja is a feel good tale with noble intentions. It may not perhaps cater much to those loving loud, fast paced entertainers, but has its moments that suits the family crowds."

Anjana George of The Times of India also awarded the film  stating "On the whole, the movie will be a treat for Malayali viewers as it has magnificently captured the essence of lives and the nature around."

Writing in Cinema Express Sajin notes "A cheerful, well-acted underdog story."

References

External links
 

2019 films
2010s Malayalam-language films
Indian drama films
Films shot in Thrissur